The 2010 Stroud Council election took place on 6 May 2010 to elect members of Stroud District Council in Gloucestershire, England. One third of the council was up for election and the Conservative Party stayed in overall control of the council.

After the election, the composition of the council was
Conservative 30
Liberal Democrat 7
Labour 7
Green 6
Independent 1

Election result
The results saw the Conservatives retain control of the council with 30 councillors despite losing 2 seats to the Liberal Democrats. The Liberal Democrats gained Dursley and Wotton-under-Edge wards from the Conservatives, to move to 7 seats, level with Labour.

Ward results

References

2010 English local elections
May 2010 events in the United Kingdom
2010
2010s in Gloucestershire